Lake Chebarkul is a lake in Chebarkulsky District, Chelyabinsk Oblast, Russia, on the slopes of the southern Urals. The name of the lake, and the city of the same name, comes from Turkic and means "Beautiful, colorful lake."

Mostly fed by snowmelt from mountain streams, the lake freezes in November and stays icebound until April. The lake is the source of the Koelga River, which in turn flows into the Uvelka, Uy, Tobol, Irtysh, and Ob Rivers. The Ob finally empties into the Arctic Ocean.

There are several wooded islands, including Grachev, Golets, the Ribatskies, and Korablik Islands. The Krutik, Marin and Nazarychev peninsulas extend into the lake. Rest homes and sanatoria are located on the shores. Lake Chebarkul is the largest of several lakes in the region, which collectively take on the name "Chebarkulsky lakes."

Fish that can be found in the lake include tench, carp, crucian carp, bream, pike, and perch.

2013 Chelyabinsk meteorite impact

On 15 February 2013, local fishermen found a hole in the ice where a large fragment from the 2013 Russian meteor event likely struck the frozen lake. Police immediately cordoned off this site, as well as one other possible impact site in the area of the lake, but scientists and interested people streamed to the area to investigate.

In the days after the impact, black fragments of rock were found around the hole, which scientists from Ural Federal University suspect are meteorite fragments, and composed of about 10% iron. Months later, divers found a large meteorite fragment on the lakebed, and it was dredged to the surface on October 16, 2013.

Gallery

Further reading
 Detailed Russian-language map of the Lake Chebarkul region
 Photos of the meteorite fragments

References

Lakes of Chelyabinsk Oblast